Lituaria is a genus of corals belonging to the family Veretillidae.

The species of this genus are found in Australia, Malesia.

Species:

Lituaria amoyensis 
Lituaria australasiae 
Lituaria breve 
Lituaria habereri 
Lituaria hicksoni 
Lituaria kuekenthali 
Lituaria molle 
Lituaria phalloides 
Lituaria philippinensis 
Lituaria valenciennesi

References

Veretillidae
Octocorallia genera